Natalie is the eponymous debut album by American R&B singer-songwriter Natalie Alvarado, released by Universal Records on May 17, 2005. The album debuted on the Billboard Top 200 albums chart at No. 16, selling over 50,000 copies in its first week.

The album features Natalie's debut single "Goin' Crazy", which peaked at No. 13 on the Billboard Hot 100 singles chart. "Goin' Crazy" also reached No. 1 in several other major markets.

Her follow-up single, "Energy", which features Baby Bash, was a minor hit, peaking at No. 66 on the Billboard Hot 100 in the summer of 2005; no video was produced for the single. The third single to be released was "Where Are You", featuring Justin Roman, which he had originally recorded a year prior with Latin girl group Soluna, but was scrapped. The album's final song, "Me Faltas Tú," is a Spanish version of "Goin' Crazy."

Track listing

Chart performance

References

2005 debut albums
Albums produced by Happy Perez
Universal Records albums